Khenchara  (Arabic: الخنشارة) is a village in Lebanon. It is situated in the Metn district (or qadaa) (Caza). It is located between Ghabet Bologna (غابة بولونيا), Bteghrine (بتغرين) and Dhour El Choueir - Ain el Sendianeh (ضهور الشوير - عين السنديانة).

The village is 30 kilometres (18.6 mi) north east of Beirut. The altitude of the village ranges from 1070 m to 1200 m.
Covering an area of about 328 hectares (1.26 sq mi), this attractive  village is known for its traditional red-roofed brick houses and its skilled stonemasons.

Khenchara and Jouar are under the same municipality. The estimated population number is 3543.
The most common families installed in the village are : Samaha, Riachy, Kanaan, Kassouf, Kfoury, Korban, Kouzy, Moawad, Henoud, Akl, Maalouf, Bejjeni, Barakat, Aboud and Abou Chawareb. The majority of the population is Melkites with some Maronites and Greek Orthodox Christians.

Khenchara is the home of the Melchite Catholic the Monastery of St. John of Chouweir or Deir et-Tabcheh, founded 1696–97. The oldest of its three churches is dedicated to St. John the Baptist and dates to the 12th century. There is also the 18th century church of Saint Nicolas, with its beautiful iconostatis of wood. In addition to its notable collection of icons and library, the monastery is also known as the site of the Middle East's first Arabic Printing Press, whose original publication appeared in 1734. A five-room museum displays the old presses and some 450 related objects and pieces of equipment. Founder of the press, Abdallah el-Zakher from Aleppo, built the oldest machine between 1726 and 1733.

The weather in Khenchara is pretty pleasant with temperatures varying from 18 to 35 degrees Celsius in summer, 13 to 20 degrees Celsius in autumn. In winter, the weather is cold with the temperatures varying from -7 to 10 degrees Celsius. It snows every winter between 30 and 70 centimeters, but the snow quickly melts.

References
Khinchara - Jouar, Localiban
Khencharajwar website (Arabic)
Tourism @ Lebanon.com

Populated places in the Matn District
Melkite Christian communities in Lebanon
Maronite Christian communities in Lebanon
Eastern Orthodox Christian communities in Lebanon